Jakub Buczek (born October 10, 1993) is a Canadian rower. He graduated from Columbia University in 2016.

Career
At both the 2018 World Rowing Championships and 2019 World Rowing Championships, Buczek was part of the men's eights boat, finishing in eighth place both years.

In May 2021, Buczek competed in the men's fours event at the Final Olympic qualification tournament, finishing in second place and qualifying for the 2020 Summer Olympics. In June 2021, Buczek was named to Canada's 2020 Olympic team.

References

External links
 
 
 
 

1993 births
Canadian male rowers
Living people
Sportspeople from Kitchener, Ontario
Columbia Lions rowers
Columbia University alumni
Rowers at the 2020 Summer Olympics
21st-century Canadian people